This is a list of broadcast television stations that are licensed in the U.S. state of New Hampshire.

Note: The state of New Hampshire is also part of the Boston television market, with the exceptions of Grafton & Sullivan counties in the Burlington, VT market, along with Carroll & Coös counties in the Portland, ME market. See List of television stations in Massachusetts.

Full-power stations

Current full-power stations 
VC refers to the station's PSIP virtual channel. RF refers to the station's physical RF channel.

Defunct full-power stations 
Channel 15: WHED-TV – satellite of WENH-TV – Hanover (4/11/1968 – 1981)
Channel 21: WNHT – Ind., CBS – Concord (4/16/1984 – 3/31/1989)
Channel 31: WRLH – NBC – Lebanon (9/10/1966 – 8/23/1968 and 8/3/1971 – 3/28/1974)
Channel 40: WEDB-TV – satellite of WENH-TV – Berlin (4/30/1969 – 1981)
Channel 50: WXPO-TV – Ind. – Manchester (10/1969 – 6/1970)

LPTV stations

Translators

See also 
 List of television stations in the United States by call sign (initial letter W)
 List of television stations in North America by media market
 List of United States over-the-air television networks
 Free-to-air#North_America – Satellite
 List of radio stations in New Hampshire

New Hampshire

Television stations